Buck Meets Ruby is an album by trumpeters Buck Clayton and Ruby Braff which was recorded in 1954 and released on the Vanguard label originally as a four track 10-inch LP.

Reception

The Allmusic review by Scott Yanow stated "A pair of spry, individualistic trumpet masters meet to a good end".

Track listing
 "Just a Groove" (Buck Clayton, Ruby Braff) – 7:44
 "Kandee" (Clayton) – 7:53
 "I Can't Get Started" (Vernon Duke, Ira Gershwin) – 11:00
 "Love Is Just Around the Corner" (Lewis Gensler, Leo Robin) – 3:54

Personnel
Buck Clayton, Ruby Braff – trumpet
Benny Morton – trombone
Buddy Tate – tenor saxophone
Jimmy Jones – piano
Steve Jordan – guitar
Aaron Bell – bass
Bobby Donaldson – drums

References

1954 albums
Buck Clayton albums
Ruby Braff albums
Vanguard Records albums
Albums produced by John Hammond (producer)